Action is a play by Sam Shepard.

Production history
Action was first performed at the Royal Court Theatre Upstairs, London, in October 1974. The original cast was as follows:
Shooter - Steven Moore
Jeep - Steven Rea 
Liza -
Lupe - Jennifer Stoller
Directed by Nancy Meckler

Plot summary

References

1975 plays
Plays by Sam Shepard